This is a list of former employees of the professional mixed martial arts promotion Bellator MMA (previously known as Bellator Fighting Championship). The fighters are listed in order by weight class.

Alumni

See also
 List of current Bellator fighters
 List of Bellator MMA records
 List of Bellator MMA champions
 List of Bellator MMA events

References

External links 
Bellator

Bellator MMA
Lists of mixed martial artists